Philander Chase Johnson (1866–1939) was an American journalist, humorist, poet, lyricist, and dramatic editor.  At the time of his death, he had been a Washington Evening Star staff member for 47 years. Prior to joining the Evening Star, he had been an editorial writer for The Washington Post.

Works
 Sayings of Uncle Eben (1896)
 Now-A-Day Poems (1900)
 Songs Of The G. O. P. (1900)
 Senator Sorghum's primer of politics (1906)
 No use kickin'  (1909)
 In the tall timber : an opera bluffe (1912)
 Somewhere In France Is the Lily (1917). L: Joseph E. Howard
 There's a Call for You and Me, Carry On (1918). m: William T. Pierson

References

External links

American male journalists
1866 births
1939 deaths
Burials at Rock Creek Cemetery